Marcus Chang Hei Yin (born 6 April 2000) is a Hong Kong professional footballer who plays as a midfielder for Hong Kong Premier League club Lee Man.

Career
In August 2018, Chang graduated from the Pegasus Academy and was promoted to the first team.

On 3 July 2020, Lee Man revealed that they had signed Chang.

References

External links

Marcus Chang at HKFA

2000 births
Living people
Hong Kong footballers
Association football midfielders
TSW Pegasus FC players
Lee Man FC players
Hong Kong Premier League players